Gary Torgow is a Detroit businessman active in business, civic, charitable and communal endeavors.

Education and personal life
Torgow has a B.A. degree and a J.D. degree and is married with five children.

Career
Gary Torgow is chairman of The Huntington National Bank, a subsidiary of Huntington Bancshares, upon the merger of Huntington and TCF Financial Corporation.

He was appointed to the board of directors of TCF Financial Corporation upon completion of the merger between Chemical Financial Corporation and legacy TCF Financial Corporation on August 1, 2019. Torgow previously served as chairman of the board of directors of Chemical Financial Corporation from August 2016 to August 2019. He also served as chairman of the board of directors of Talmer Bancorp, Inc. from December 2009 to July 2016.

Prior to his work with Talmer Bancorp and Chemical Financial Corporation, Torgow founded and chaired Sterling Group, a real estate, development, and investment company based in Michigan.

Communal and civic activity

Torgow is on the boards of Blue Cross Blue Shield of Michigan, DTE Energy, Community Foundation of Southeastern Michigan, Business Leaders for Michigan, Jewish Federation of Metropolitan Detroit, and the Detroit Regional Partnership.

Torgow has served as chairman of the Detroit Economic Growth Corporation, the Michigan Civil Rights Commission and First Place Bank. On Jan 25, 2019, Governor Gretchen Whitmer designated Torgow as one of her emergency interim successors.

He has received a number of honors and awards including the NAACP Fannie Lou Hamer Award, the Jewish Federation of Metropolitan Detroit's Frank Wetsman Young Leadership Award, and the Wayne State University School of Law Outstanding Alumni Award.

He is the author of "Raising the Bar", and "Holy Warrior", and has given numerous talks and lectures throughout the country.

References

American bankers
Economy of Detroit
Living people
Year of birth missing (living people)
American company founders